The Sunday Times CNA Literary Awards are awarded annually to South African writers by the South African weekly newspaper the Sunday Times. They comprise the ''Sunday Times CNA Literary Award for Non-fiction and the Sunday Times CNA Literary Award for Fiction, and are awarded for full-length non-fiction works and novels, respectively. Both winners receive R100 000. Ivan Vladislavic is the only person to have won both the fiction and the non-fiction award.

History of the Awards

Originally established in 1989, the Alan Paton Award was conferred annually for meritorious works of non-fiction. It aimed to reward books presenting "the illumination of truthfulness, especially those forms of it that are new, delicate, unfashionable and fly in the face of power," and demonstrating "compassion, elegance of writing, and intellectual and moral integrity." The award was named for Alan Paton, the famous South African author of Cry, The Beloved Country.

In 2001, a companion award for fiction was established, the Sunday Times Fiction Prize. The criteria stipulate that the winning novel should be one of "rare imagination and style... a tale so compelling as to become an enduring landmark of contemporary fiction." The prize was restructured in 2015 when fiction and non-fiction awards were brought together as the Sunday Times Literary Awards; the money for each prize was increased, from R75 000 to R100 000, and the Fiction Prize was renamed the Barry Ronge Fiction Prize in honour of Barry Ronge, a renowned South African journalist who was one of the founders of the awards.

In 2020, there was a one-year hiatus due to the COVID-19 pandemic. However, the awards recommenced in 2021 with a new sponsor, CNA, a South African retail chain of stationery shops, and are now known as the Sunday Times'' CNA Literary Awards. This sponsorship arrangement followed the acquisition of CNA from "embattled" parent company Edcon in February 2020. In 2021, books published between 1 December 2018 and 1 December 2020 were eligible.

Fiction winners

Non-fiction winners

References

South African literary awards
Fiction awards
Non-fiction literary awards
Awards established in 2001
Awards established in 1989
2001 establishments in South Africa
1989 establishments in South Africa